FARC dissidents (Spanish: Disidencias de las Farc), also known as Carlos Patino Front, refers to a group, formerly part of the Revolutionary Armed Forces of Colombia (FARC), who have refused to lay down their arms after the Colombian peace process came into effect in 2016, or resumed their insurgency afterwards. In 2018, the dissidents numbered some 2,000, to 2,500, armed combatants with an unknown number of civilian militia supporting them. The FARC dissidents have become "an increasing headache" for the Colombian armed forces, as they have to fight them, the Popular Liberation Army (EPL), the National Liberation Army (ELN), and the Clan del Golfo at the same time.

FARC dissidents have been responsible for several attacks on the Colombian armed forces. These fighters are believed to be heavily involved in the production and sale of cocaine. In June 2020, it was revealed that the presence of FARC dissidents in northern Antioquia instigated a direct armed conflict with the Clan del Golfo known as Operation Mil.

Organization

Leadership and membership
FARC dissidents have been led by former mid-level commanders such as alias Gentil Duarte, alias Euclides Mora, alias Jhon 40, alias Giovanny Chuspas and alias Julián Chollo. The group has attempted to recruit locals in the Putumayo Province in Colombia to take up their cause. On October 15, 2020, Colombian President Iván Duque announced that a FARC dissent member known by the alias of "Cabuyo" was now the head of the FARC dissents.

Locations
Dissidents of FARC's 1st Front are located in the eastern plains of Colombia. Jhon 40 and their dissident 43rd Front moved into the Amazonas state of western Venezuela where they can operate with Colombian allies. Venezuela has served as the primary location for many FARC dissidents. Other dissidents hide in the mountains north of Medellín. In 2018, Cabuyo was reported to be based in the north of Antioquia.

These groups have constituted a form of parallel state in very poor rural areas historically marked by the absence of the state they control. They manage disputes of all kinds, such as divorce and theft, organize public works, and impose taxes on economic activities. Prostitution, gambling and drug use are prohibited. Some of the population viewed this presence favorably: "FARC exerts a positive control, thanks to which these regions are healthy. The government looks down on them, but in this village you can go to bed with money in your pocket, it's always there when you wake up. In other areas, you will wake up without even your clothes."

Aims and ideology
Despite claiming to still follow the Leftist ideology of FARC, many dissidents are more motivated in their continuing struggle against the government by difficulty with reintegrating into civilian society, a desire to protect themselves from other paramilitary or crime groups, and criminal connections. Dissident groups would become part of the rivalries between the different drug cartels, allying with some and fighting against others.

Events 

On 15 July 2018, the Colombian and Peruvian governments launched a joint military effort known as Operation Armageddon to combat FARC dissidents. Peru issued a 60-day state of emergency in the Putumayo Province, an area bordering both Colombia and Ecuador. On the first day alone, more than 50 individuals were arrested in the operation, with the majority being Colombian nationals, while four cocaine labs were dismantled.

On 28 July 2019, during the XXV São Paulo Forum hosted in Caracas, Nicolás Maduro declared that the FARC-EP dissidents leaders Iván Márquez and Jesús Santrich were "welcome" in Venezuela and to the São Paulo Forum on condition that they lay down their arms.

On 26 June 2020, Clan del Golfo and FARC dissidents were confirmed to be in a direct armed conflict in northern Antioquia known as Operation Mil. The Clan del Golfo, which dispatched 1,000 of its paramilitaries from Urabá, southern Córdoba and Chocó, hopes to remove FARC dissent from northern Antioquia and take control of the entire municipality of Ituango.

On 21 March 2021, the National Bolivarian Armed Forces of Venezuela launched a large-scale military operation against FARC dissidents in Apure, Venezuela. The 2021 Apure clashes has resulted in the mass displacement of over 5,000 civilians to Colombia.

On 25 May 2022, Colombian and Venezuelan intelligence officials confirmed the death of Miguel Botache Santillana, alias Gentil Duarte, the top leader of the FARC dissidents.

See also 

 2021 Apure clashes
Dissident Irish Republicans

References

Organizations established in 2016
2016 establishments in Colombia
Bacrims
Colombian guerrilla movements
Far-left politics in Colombia
Drug cartels in Colombia
FARC